The Stern-Bryan fellowship is an annual summer internship program for British journalists at The Washington Post.  The internship was established in honour of Post journalist, Laurence Stern.  A fund for the program is managed by the National Press Foundation.  Awardees are selected by the Post.  Many program alumni have gone on to national prominence in British journalism. In 2020, the fellowship was renamed the Stern-Bryan fellowship in hour of Felicity Bryan, who started the scheme in 1980.

Past winners
 1980 - David Leigh
 1981 - James Naughtie
 1982 - Penny Chorlton
 1983 - Ian Black
 1984 - Mary Ann Sieghart, Financial Times
 1985 - Lionel Barber, Financial Times
 1986 - Ewen MacAskill, The Scotsman
 1987 - Sarah Helm, The Independent
 1988 - Ed Vulliamy, The Guardian
 1989 - Adela Gooch, The Daily Telegraph
 1990 - Keith Kendrick, The Birmingham Post
 1991 - Liz Hunt, The Independent
 1992 - Jonathan Freedland, BBC
 1993 - Ian Katz, The Guardian
 1994 - Rebecca Fowler, The Sunday Times
 1995 - Sarah Neville, Yorkshire Post
 1996 - Gary Younge, The Guardian
 1997 - Audrey Gillan, The Guardian
 1998 - Caroline Daniel, New Statesman
 1999 - William Woodward, The Guardian
 2000 - Cathy Newman, Financial Times
 2001 - Glenda Cooper, Daily Mail
 2002 - Helen Rumbelow, The Times
 2003 - Tania Branigan, The Guardian
 2004 - Mary Fitzgerald, The Belfast Telegraph
 2005 - Sam Coates, The Times
 2006 - Anushka Asthana, The Observer
 2007 - Paul Lewis, The Guardian
 2008 - Holly Watt, The Sunday Times
 2009 - Alexi Mostrous, The Times
 2010 - Michael Savage, The Independent
 2011 - Shyamantha Asokan and Alice Fordham (joint winners)
 2012 - James Ball, The Guardian
 2013 - Billy Kenber, The Times
 2014 - Sebastian Payne, The Spectator
 2015 - Tom Rowley, The Telegraph
 2016 - Louisa Loveluck
 2017 - Madhumita Murgia, Financial Times
 2018 - Gabriel Pogrund, The Sunday Times
 2019 - Laura Hughes, Financial Times

References

External links
Laurence (Larry) Stern a biography of Laurence Stern at Spartacus Educational

American journalism organizations
Internship programs